Gunilda was a steel-hulled Scottish-built steam yacht in service between her construction in 1897 and her sinking in Lake Superior in 1911. Built in 1897 in Leith, Scotland by Ramage & Ferguson for J. M. or A. R. & J. M. Sladen, and became owned by F. W. Sykes in 1898; her first and second owners were all from England. In 1901, Gunilda was chartered by a member of the New York Yacht Club, sailing across the Atlantic Ocean with a complement of 25 crewmen. In 1903, she was purchased by oil baron William L. Harkness of Cleveland, Ohio, a member of the New York Yacht Club; she ended up becoming the club's flagship. Under Harkness' ownership, Gunilda visited many parts of the world, including the Caribbean, and beginning in 1910, the Great Lakes.

In the summer of 1911, Gunilda owner, William L. Harkness, his family and friends were on an extended tour of northern Lake Superior. They were headed to Rossport, Ontario and then planned to head into Lake Nipigon to do some fishing for speckled trout. Most of the passengers were taken to Rossport. Harkness stayed behind to supervise the salvage, hiring the tug James Whalen and a barge to tow Gunilda off the shoal. On August 11, 1911, after she was pulled free, she suddenly rolled over to starboard, filled with water, and sank. Harkness and his family were picked up by James Whalen.

Gunildas wreck was the subject of multiple failed salvage attempts. In the late 1960s, Ed and Harold Flatt made multiple unsuccessful attempts to salvage her. Throughout the 1970s, Fred Broennle also made several unsuccessful attempts to raise Gunilda. In 1980, Jacques Cousteau and the Cousteau Society used the research vessel Calypso and the diving saucer SP-350 Denise to dive and film the wreck. The Cousteau Society called Gunilda the "best-preserved, most prestigious shipwreck in the world" and "the most beautiful shipwreck in the world".

History

Design and construction

Gunilda (UK official number 104928) was built in 1897 by Ramage & Ferguson in Leith, Scotland. Her hull number was 149. She was designed by Joseph Edwin Wilkins, a naval architect who worked for Cox & King of Pall Mall, London, England. She cost about $200,000 to build. Her name is a variant of Gunhild, an old Germanic feminine name meaning "war". She was launched on April 1, 1897.

She had a gross register tonnage of 385 and a net register tonnage of 158. She had a Thames Tonnage of 492 or 499 tons.

The engine was powered by steam produced by two 160 psi turbine boilers.

Service history

Between 1897 and 1898 Gunilda was owned by either J. M. Sladen or by A. R. and J. M. Sladen; her home port was Wivenhoe in England. Her second owner was F. W. Sykes, who owned her between 1898 and 1903, during which time her home port was Leith. Her first and second owners were from England.

In 1901, Gunilda was chartered by a member of the New York Yacht Club of New York City, sailing over the Atlantic Ocean with 25 crewmen on board.

In 1903, Gunilda was purchased by oil baron William L. Harkness of Cleveland, Ohio. Harkness was a member of the New York Yacht Club. When he purchased Gunilda, she was officially registered in New York City and became the new flagship of the New York Yacht Club. In 1903, Gunildas home port was Philadelphia, Pennsylvania, however, in 1904, it became New York City. Under the ownership of Harkness, Gunilda visited several parts of the world, making multiple trips around the Atlantic Ocean and the Caribbean. In 1910, Harkness brought Gunilda to the Great Lakes to perform an extended cruise.

Final voyage

In 1911, William L. Harkness, his family and his friends were on an extended tour of the north shore of Lake Superior. In August 1911, the people on board had made plans to head into Lake Nipigon to fish for speckled trout. To sail into Lake Nipigon, Gunilda (manned by a crew of 20) needed to travel to Rossport, Ontario, then into Nipigon Bay, and finally through the Schreiber Channel. When Gunilda docked in Coldwell Harbor, Ontario, Harkness sought a pilot to guide them to Rossport and then into Nipigon Bay. Donald Murray, an experienced local man, offered his services for $15, but Harkness declined, claiming it was too much. The following day, Gunilda stopped in Jackfish Bay, Ontario to load coal. Harkness once again inquired about a pilot. Harry Legault offered to pilot Gunilda to Rossport for $25 plus a train fare back to Jackfish Bay. Gunilda captain, Alexander Corckum, and his crew thought the offer was reasonable, but Harkness once again declined. As the US charts did not indicate that there were any shoals on their intended course, Harkness decided to proceed without a pilot with accurate knowledge of the region. Gunilda ran  onto the shoal, raising her bow high out of the water.

After the grounding, Harkness and some his family and friends boarded one of Gunilda motor launches and travelled to Rossport, catching a Canadian Pacific Railway train to Port Arthur, Ontario, where Harkness made arrangements for the Canadian Towing & Wrecking Company's tug James Whalen to be dispatched to free Gunilda. The next day, on August 11 (some sources state August 29, one source states August 31), James Whalen arrived with a barge in tow. The captain of James Whalen advised Harkness to hire a second tug and barge to properly stabilize Gunilda. Harkness once again refused. As Gunilda didn't have any towing bitts, a sling was slung around her and attached to James Whalen, and she pulled Gunilda directly astern. Gunilda engines were reversed, but she remained on the shoal. They then tried to swing the stern back and forth, but this also failed. Wrecking master J. Wolvin of James Whalen decided to pull solely to starboard, as it was impossible to maneuver her stern to the port. Gunilda slid off the shoal, but as she slid into the water, she suddenly keeled over, and her masts hit the water. Water poured in through the portholes, doors, companionways, hatches, and skylights. Gunilda sank in a couple of minutes. As she sank, the crew of James Whalen cut the towline, fearing that Gunilda would pull her down as well. After Gunilda sank, the people who remained on her were picked up by James Whalen.

Lloyd's of London paid out a $100,000 insurance policy.

Gunilda wreck
This ship is very well-preserved, as can be seen from photographs taken by a dive team in 2022.

Gunilda today

The wreck of Gunilda was discovered in 1967 by Chuck Zender, who also made the first-ever dive to her. Her wreck is very intact, with everything that was on her when she sank still in place, including her entire superstructure, compass binnacle, and both of her masts. Numerous artefacts including a piano, several lanterns, and various pieces of furniture remain on board. Most of the paint on her hull survives, including the gilding. In 1980, Jacques Cousteau and the Cousteau Society used the research vessel Calypso and the diving saucer SP-350 Denise to dive and film the wreck. The Cousteau Society called Gunilda "the best-preserved, most prestigious shipwreck in the world" and "the most beautiful shipwreck in the world".

Two divers have died on the wreck of Gunilda. Charles "King" Hague died in 1970; his body was recovered in 1976. Reg Barrett from Burlington, Ontario died in 1989.

In 2019 a blogger on the Professional Association of Diving Instructors Tecrec blogsite named Gunilda the second-best technical diving site in the world, after the German battleship SMS Markgraf in Scapa Flow.

Salvage attempts
Ed and Harold Flatt of Thunder Bay, Ontario launched the first salvage attempt on Gunilda. They used cranes and a barge to hook onto Gunilda hull, managing to haul a piece of her mast up to the surface. They made another failed attempt in 1968, but a storm wrecked their barge and washed away most of their equipment.

In the 1970s, Fred Broennle made several attempts to raise Gunilda. In August 1970 Broennle and his dive partner, 23-year old Charles "King" Hague, dove Gunilda wreck. On August 8, 1970 Broennle and Hague anchored over the wreck, but there were complications during the dive; Hague dove first, dying in the process. Broennle tried to rescue him but got decompression sickness.

In about 1973 or 1974 Broennle set up Deep Diving Systems to raise Gunilda wreck, building several diving bells and purchasing several barges, cranes, and a Biomarine CCR 1000 rebreather. Several of his earlier dives were unsuccessful.

During the salvage efforts, Broennle recovered a brass grate from one of the skylights.

In April 1976 Broennle bought the wreck of Gunilda from Lloyd's of London on the condition that he could raise her. On July 13, 1976 while exploring the wreck with underwater cameras, Broennle located Hague's remains close to the wreck, near the port side of the stern, and recovered them sometime later. In September 1976 Broennle planned to dive Gunilda with his submersible Constructor, which cost Deep Diving Systems $1.5 million to design and build. Constructor bankrupted Broennle and Deep Diving Systems, ending their salvage efforts.
In 1998, the story of Broennle's salvage efforts were made into a film, Drowning in Dreams.

References

Sources

External links

Gunilda 2001, by Terry Irvine via YouTube
Gunilda 2011 - 100 Years, by Terry Irvine via YouTube
Gunilda 2016, by Richard Kurzel via YouTube
Yacht Gunilda, by Liquid Productions
Gunilda, by Superior Trips
Gunilda - Great Lakes Shipwreck Photos, by Shipwreck Explorers

1897 ships
Maritime incidents in 1911
Ships built in Scotland
Shipwrecks of Canada
Shipwrecks of Lake Superior
Steam yachts
Yachts of New York Yacht Club members
Ships sunk with no fatalities
Shipwrecks of the Ontario coast
Wreck diving sites